Lyclene xanthopera is a moth of the subfamily Arctiinae. It is found in Singapore and on Borneo. The habitat consists of lowland areas, including heath forests.

References

Nudariina
Moths of Asia